Still Fighting the War is a studio album by American musician Slaid Cleaves. It was released in June 2013 under Music Road Records.

Track listing

Note: Some versions of the CD insert “Go for the Gold” between “In the Rain” and “Voice of Midnight”

Chart performance

References

External links
Still Fighting the War by Slaid Cleaves at iTunes.com
Slaid Cleaves discusses the making of the album and the genesis of the title track on episode 146 of the Americana Music Show, released July 1, 2013

2013 albums
Slaid Cleaves albums